Daulet Turlykhanov (born 18 November 1963) is a Kazakhstani former wrestler who competed in the 1988 Summer Olympics, in the 1992 Summer Olympics, and in the 1996 Summer Olympics.

References

1965 births
Living people
Olympic wrestlers of the Soviet Union
Olympic wrestlers of the Unified Team
Olympic wrestlers of Kazakhstan
Wrestlers at the 1988 Summer Olympics
Wrestlers at the 1992 Summer Olympics
Wrestlers at the 1996 Summer Olympics
Kazakhstani male sport wrestlers
Olympic silver medalists for the Soviet Union
Olympic bronze medalists for the Unified Team
Olympic medalists in wrestling
Asian Games medalists in wrestling
Soviet male sport wrestlers
Wrestlers at the 1994 Asian Games
World Wrestling Championships medalists
Medalists at the 1992 Summer Olympics
Medalists at the 1988 Summer Olympics
Medalists at the 1994 Asian Games
Asian Games gold medalists for Kazakhstan